HFH can be:
 Habitat for Hope, an American children's health-related organization
 Habitat for Humanity, a Christian development charity
 Hemifacial hypertrophy
 Henry Ford Hospital, in Detroit, Michigan, United States
 Hôpital Français de Hanoi, in Vietnam